Events from the year 1807 in Denmark.

Incumbents
 Monarch – Christian VII
 Prime minister – Christian Günther von Bernstorff

Events

 7 January – England declares an embargo against France and its allies, including Denmark-Norway.
 29 January – The Danish fortress Frederiksnagore surrenders to the British forces and will remain occupied until 1815. Trankebar and the Danish West Indies are also occupied by the British during the conflict.
 17 April – The Royal Institute for the Deaf is founded in Copenhagen.
 6 May – Mozart's Don Juan is performed in Copenhagen for the first time, with Édouard Du Puy in the title role.
 29 August – The Battle of Køge, also known as the 'Clogs Battle', between British troops besieging Copenhagen and Danish militia raised on Zealand ends in British victory.
 16 August – British troops land at Vedbæk.
 29–31 August – Battle at Classens Have which is destroyed.
 2 September – Bombardment of Copenhagen starts: 290 properties burn and another 1,500 to 1,600 are damaged; 2,000 people are killed or wounded; and the Church of Our Lady and the University are among the buildings which burn.
 7 September – Peymann, the commander of Copenhagen, surrenders to the British after four days of bombardment of the city.
 21 October – The British sail away with the Danish naval fleet (17 ships of the line, 12 frigates, 8 brigs, 35 smaller vessels and 81 transport ships) after destroying the ships under construction at the Holmen Naval Base.
 31 October – Denmark-Norway is forced into an alliance with Napoleon.
 4 November – England declares war on Denmark-Norway.

Undated
 From this year annual art exhibitions are held at Charlottenborg.
 The first step towards the establishment of the museum for Nordic antiquities are made when a small collection is exhibited in the loft above Trinitatis Church in Copenhagen.

Births
 30 March – Henrik Rung, composer, conductor and vocal pedagogue (died 1871)
 5 June – Georg Hilker, decorative painter during the Danish Golden Age (died 1875)
 22 August – Emma Hartmann, composer (died 1851)
 18 September – Mads Johansen Lange, trader, "King of Bali" (died 1856)
 23 November – Carl Joachim Hambro, bankier, founder of Hambros Bank (died 1877)

Deaths
 17 August  Johannes Nikolaus Tetens, philosopher, statesman and scientist (born 1736)
 23 December  Peter Leonhard Gianelli, medallist (born 1767)

References

 
1800s in Denmark
Denmark
Years of the 19th century in Denmark